Rali Mampeule (b. Ralebala Matome Mampeule) is a South African entrepreneur, he is the founder of the South African Housing and Infrastructure Fund. He is the first black South African to own a Real Estate agency in South Africa.

Background
Rali Mampeule was born on 22 December 1979 in Mokwasele village, Modjadji and grew up in Daveyton township in Benoni, Johannesburg, South Africa . He attended his secondary education at Rand Park High School then attained a Bachelor of Commerce degree from the University of South Africa then an Advanced Management Development Program (AMPD) in Real Estate from Harvard University .

Rali started his career in real estate in 2001 as a real estate agent assistant at Chas Everitt International Property Group in Brynston, Johannesburg and in 2004, he acquired a Chas Everitt franchise in Midrand, South Africa, making him the first black real estate top executive in South African history.

In 2005 Nedbank awarded Rali Mampeule with the Young Lion Award and the Property Professional of the Year Award in the following year 2006/2007. Rali was a contributor to the South African Property Transformation Charter in 2006 and in 2008, he was awarded the African Heritage Society (AHS) Emerging Entrepreneur of the Year.

Rali Mampeule founded South African Housing and Infrastructure Fund in 2019 to assist the South African government in addressing the country’s housing deficit, the fund is currently valued at $1 Billion and has sat at the Real Estate Industry Regulator the Estate Agents Affairs Board (EAAB). In 2019, Mampeule became the first South African to join the Forbes Real Estate Council. He was appointed chairman of the University of Johannesburg in April 2022.

Controversies 
In 2020, a company controlled by Mampeule took a R44 million commission on the R70 million sale of a parcel of land to the Gauteng Department of Human Settlements (GDHS), the commission amounting to 62% of the sale price. The parcel of land was purchased by its previous owner for R6.3 million just four years prior. In 2022, the Office of the Public Protector and law-enforcement agencies commenced investigations into the transaction. In 2019, Landsworth, another Mampeule-controlled company, purchased a property for R86 million, and immediately sold it to the GDHS for R245 million, the sale to GDHS having been negotiated before Landsworth purchased the property.

References

1979 births
Living people
South African businesspeople
South African business executives
South African chief executives
South African company founders
South African corporate directors